Gem Air is a commuter airline based in Salmon, Idaho, United States. The company has been operating in Idaho since 1982 (though the company operated under the name Salmon Air until 2009, when they sold the name to McCall Aviation). Between 2009 and 2014, the company offered limited charter and contract services. In 2014, Gem Air again started offering a full fleet of charter, scheduled, and cargo services. Gem Air mainly serves the mountain west: Idaho, Montana, Wyoming, Utah, Washington, and Oregon.

Destinations
Gem Air provides on-demand flights to the Idaho backcountry, including flights to the Frank Church River of No Return Wilderness and Selway-Bitterroot wilderness. Gem Air also offers summer service between multiple towns and cities within the state, including Boise, Salmon, Stanley, and McCall. Scheduled service is offered September–May between Boise and Salmon. Gem Air offers on-demand (charter) service to the entire mountain west, operating frequently in and out of Salt Lake City, UT, Sun Valley, ID, Jackson Hole, WY, Bozeman, MT, and Bend, OR.

Passenger

 Boise - Boise Airport
 McCall - McCall Municipal Airport
 Salmon - Lemhi County Airport
 Stanley - Stanley Airport
Frank Church River of No Return Wilderness Airstrips
Selway-Bitterroot Wilderness Airstrips

Cargo
 
Idaho
 Burley - Burley Municipal Airport
 Challis - Challis Airport
 Idaho Falls - Idaho Falls Regional Airport
 Salmon - Lemhi County Airport
Utah
 Salt Lake City - Salt Lake City International Airport
 Logan - Logan-Cache Airport
Oregon

 Burns - Burns Municipal Airport

Fleet
Gem Air's fleet includes the following aircraft:

Accidents and incidents 
 On 13 April 2022, a Cessna 208 Caravan registration N928JP, operating a cargo flight, crashed while on approach to the Burley Municipal Airport. The only occupant on board died.

References

External links
 

Airlines based in Idaho
Regional Airline Association members
Transportation companies based in Idaho
Transportation in Lemhi County, Idaho
Airlines established in 1968
1968 establishments in Idaho